Trelights is a hamlet in North Cornwall, England, United Kingdom and is situated in the civil parish of St Endellion,  north of the town of Wadebridge.

Trelights lies within the Cornwall Area of Outstanding Natural Beauty (AONB).

References

Hamlets in Cornwall